Jan Jiráň (19 June 1941 – 9 March 2017) was a Czechoslovak sprint canoer who competed in the mid-1960s. At the 1964 Summer Olympics in Tokyo, he finished ninth in the C-1 1000 m event.

References
Jan Jiráň's profile at Sports Reference.com
Jan Jiráň's profile at the Czech Olympic Committee 

1941 births
2017 deaths
Canoeists at the 1964 Summer Olympics
Czechoslovak male canoeists
Olympic canoeists of Czechoslovakia